Glory of the Roman Empire is a 2006 city-building video game set during the age of the Roman Empire, developed by Haemimont Games. The game features a three-dimensional game engine and individual modeling of game character behaviors. The game was released in Spain and Italy in December 2006 by FX Interactive under the name Imperium Civitas. The difference in naming is explained by the popularity of Haemimont's previous games, Imperium I, II and III, which sold more than 1 million copies in these countries.

In the game, the player assumes the roles of city planner, governor, and military leader. Successful players will need planning skills, economic savvy, and—should those fail—military might. The glory of the Roman Empire will challenge gamers to grow a small village into a thriving community through trade with neighbors, while also expanding and defending its borders through more militaristic means. Players will need to focus on the physical and emotional health of the citizenry; as villagers age and mature under strong leadership, they contribute to the development of more advanced societies and larger cities.

A demo was released by Haemimont games on June 14, 2006, and a sequel - Imperium Romanum - was released in 2008.

Scenarios 
Glory of the Roman Empire:

Missions take place in Florentia (5 missions), Pompeii (1 mission), Syracusae (4 missions), Toletum (3 missions), Kartagena (3 missions), Massilia (2 missions), Mediolanum (2 missions), Lugdunum (2 missions), Londinium (3 missions), and Colonia Claudia (3 missions)

There are seven more scenarios that are sandboxes: Mountain Paradise, Desert, Highlander, Across the river, Mamertum, Halkedonia, and Rome.

It also has a challenge mode where the player has to achieve random goals for 4 different cities.

Imperium Civitas: (Spanish and Italian edition)

There are two campaigns instead of one as in Glory of the Roman Empire. A military campaign and a peaceful campaign.

There are 12 freebuild cities: Burdigala, Colonia Agrippina, Syena, Andautonia, Roma, Geneva, Venetia, Tamiatis, Labacum, Antium, Salamantica, and Emerita Augusta

In the challenge mode the player can choose from Londinium, Lutetia, Colonia Agrippina, Burdigala, Lugdunum, Mediolanum, Andautonia, Tarraco, Carthago Nova, Tingis, Caralis, Carthago, Syracusae, Pompeii, and Roma.

Reception 

The game received "average" reviews according to the review aggregation website Metacritic.

See also 

 Haemimont Games
 City-building game

References

External links 
 
  at Haemimont Games
  at FX Interactive 
 

City-building games
Windows games
Windows-only games
2006 video games
Video games set in the Roman Empire
Multiplayer online games
Video games developed in Bulgaria
Video game sequels
Video games set in antiquity
CDV Software Entertainment games